Hymenobacter kanuolensis  is a Gram-negative, rod-shaped, radiation-resistant and non-motile bacterium from the genus of Hymenobacter which has been isolated from soil from the Qinghai-Tibet Plateau in Tibet in China.

References 

kanuolensis
Bacteria described in 2014